Baringo may refer to:

Lake Baringo, Kenya
Baringo County, Kenya

ru:Баринго (значения)
sv:Baringo